Sellier is a surname. Notable people with the surname include:

Charles Sellier (1943–2011), American television producer, writer, and film director
Félix Sellier (1893–1965), Belgian cyclist
Jean le Sellier (died 1517), English politician

See also
Sellier & Bellot, Czech ammunition manufacturing company